Closet Monster was a Canadian punk rock band from Ajax, Ontario.

Biography 
Closet Monster was formed at Pickering High School in 1997. The most recent lineup played their final show on December 8, 2005 at the Phoenix in Toronto with Underground Operations label mates Dead Letter Dept, Bombs Over Providence, Hostage Life and Protest The Hero. The band has achieved much publicity from touring Canada, the United States and Europe, playing dates on the Warped Tour, and starting a very successful Canadian record label, Underground Operations. Closet Monster have shared the stage with the likes of Billy Talent, Rise Against, Alexisonfire, Propagandhi, Hot Water Music, SNFU, Madball, Atom And His Package, Suicidal Tendencies, KNUT, Dead Kennedys, Silverstein, 25tolife, The Suicide Machines, Buck-O-Nine, The Casualties, Choke, Mad Caddies, D.b.s., Mastodon, Atreyu, Ten Foot Pole, Moneen, Protest the Hero, The Movielife, Social Distortion, Bad Religion Warped Tour 2004 & 2005 and many other bands.

Their lyrics have an anarchist theme.

The band reunited in 2009 for one show at Wakestock Festival.

Before shutting down, Underground Operations released Suicide Note, an anthological compilation album of Closet Monster's work, as their last release.

Final line up 
 Mark "London" Spicoluk – bass guitar
 Jesse Colburn – guitar
 Adam Cyncora – guitar
 Aaron Verdonk – drums

Past members 
 Brandon Hilbiorn "b-unit" – guitar, vocals
 Christopher McCartney – drums
 Kyle Gordon Stanley – drums
 Mark McAdam "MC" – guitar
 Jon Marshall "Rudy" – guitar, vocals
 Matt 'The Ween' Murphy – guitar

Discography

Studio albums 
So Be It - 1997
Pure Unfiltered Anarchy - 1998
A Fight For What Is Right - 1999
Where The Fuck Is Revolution? - 2000
Killed The Radio Star - 2002
We Rebuilt This City - 2004

Singles

Compilation albums
Suicide Note - 2016

Music videos 
 "Mr. Holland Vs. Acceptable Behaviour" (2002)
 "Corporate Media Death Squad" (2003)
 "Mamma Anti-Fascisto: Never Surrender" (2004)
 "Punk Rock Ruined Our Lives" (2005)

References

External links 
 Closet Monster Myspace Page
 Closet Monster @ BandoftheDay.com
 Underground Operations Official Website

Canadian punk rock groups
Anarcho-punk groups
Musical groups established in 1997
Musical groups from the Regional Municipality of Durham